Le Progrès, previously Mouvement Le Progrès then Progrès 974, is a political party in Réunion founded in 2013, by dissidents from the local federation of the Socialist Party.

History 
The party contested the 2022 French legislative election as part of NUPES. Emeline K/Bidi was elected the party's only Member of Parliament.

See also 

 List of political parties in Réunion

References 

Political parties in Réunion
2013 establishments in France
Political parties established in 2013
Social democratic parties in France